Guildhall is a town in and the shire town (county seat) of Essex County, Vermont. As of the 2020 census, the population was 262. According to a large sign in the town center, it is the only town in the world so named. The name derives from a meeting house on the square called the Guildhall.

Guildhall is part of the Berlin, NH–VT Micropolitan Statistical Area.

Geography

Guildhall is in northeastern Vermont, along the Connecticut River, the border between Vermont and New Hampshire. The town is bordered to the southwest by Lunenburg, to the northwest by Granby, and to the north by Maidstone, Vermont. To the southeast, across the Connecticut, are the towns of Northumberland and Lancaster, New Hampshire.

U.S. Route 2 passes through the southern corner of the town, leading west into Lunenburg and east across the Connecticut into Lancaster. Vermont Route 102 runs north from Route 2 and follows the Connecticut into Maidstone.

Demographics

As of the census of 2000, there were 268 people, 106 households, and 76 families living in the town.  The population density was 8.2 people per square mile (3.2/km2).  There were 151 housing units at an average density of 4.6 per square mile (1.8/km2).  The racial makeup of the town was 95.15% White, 0.37% Asian, 0.37% from other races, and 4.10% from two or more races. Hispanic or Latino of any race were 0.75% of the population.

There were 106 households, out of which 29.2% had children under the age of 18 living with them, 58.5% were couples living together and joined in either marriage or civil union, 4.7% had a female householder with no husband present, and 28.3% were non-families. 22.6% of all households were made up of individuals, and 15.1% had someone living alone who was 65 years of age or older.  The average household size was 2.53 and the average family size was 2.96.

In the town, the population was spread out, with 24.3% under the age of 18, 6.7% from 18 to 24, 22.8% from 25 to 44, 25.0% from 45 to 64, and 21.3% who were 65 years of age or older.  The median age was 43 years. For every 100 females, there were 88.7 males.  For every 100 females age 18 and over, there were 86.2 males.

The median income for a household in the town was $31,750, and the median income for a family was $38,958. Males had a median income of $30,313 versus $23,438 for females. The per capita income for the town was $17,326.  About 10.4% of families and 10.3% of the population were below the poverty line, including 6.3% of those under the age of eighteen and 22.0% of those 65 or over.

Climate

This climatic region is typified by large seasonal temperature differences, with warm to hot (and often humid) summers and cold (sometimes severely cold) winters.  According to the Köppen Climate Classification system, Guildhall has a humid continental climate, abbreviated "Dfb" on climate maps.

References

External links

 Town of Guildhall official website
 A Flickr album of historic buildings

 
Towns in Vermont
County seats in Vermont
Berlin, New Hampshire micropolitan area
Vermont populated places on the Connecticut River
Towns in Essex County, Vermont